Anaïs Morand (born 10 March 1993) is a Swiss pair skater and Red Bull Crashed Ice competitor in the sport of ice cross downhill. Competing in pairs with Antoine Dorsaz, she skated at seven ISU Championships, achieving their best result (8th) at the 2010 Europeans, and at the 2010 Winter Olympics (15th). In 2011 and 2012, she competed at three ISU Championships with Timothy Leemann. She is the 2018 Crans-Montana Riders Cup Ice Cross champion.

Career

Figure skating 
Morand teamed up with Antoine Dorsaz in 2006. They spent their first two seasons together on the junior circuit. In 2008–09 they competed in both juniors and seniors, finishing 12th at the European Championships and 10th at the World Junior Championships. They were not able to qualify a spot for Switzerland for the Winter Olympics.

Morand and Dorsaz began the 2009–10 season at the 2009 Nebelhorn Trophy, where they qualified a spot for Switzerland at the 2010 Winter Olympics. They continued to skate on the junior Grand Prix circuit and moved up to 8th at the European Championships. They were 15th at the Olympics and moved up to 13th at Worlds. Dorsaz retired from competitive skating after the 2010 season, citing lack of motivation. It was then announced that Morand would compete in ladies' single skating until she found a new partner. She later teamed up with Timothy Leemann, but did compete in the ladies' event at the Junior Grand Prix Austria in Graz, finishing in 25th place. In July 2012, it was reported that their partnership had ended.

Ice cross 
In 2015, Morand began competing in ice cross downhill.

Programs

With Leemann

Singles career

With Dorsaz

Competitive highlights 
JGP: Junior Grand Prix

Single skating

Pair skating with Leeman

Pair skating with Dorsaz

References

External links 

 Anaïs Morand at atsx.org
 
 

Swiss female pair skaters
Swiss female single skaters
1993 births
Living people
Sportspeople from Valais
Figure skaters at the 2010 Winter Olympics
Olympic figure skaters of Switzerland